The Goncourt brothers were Edmond de Goncourt (1822–1896) and Jules de Goncourt (1830–1870), both French naturalism writers who, as collaborative sibling authors, were inseparable in life.

Background
Edmond and Jules were born to minor aristocrats Marc-Pierre Huot de Goncourt and his second wife Annette-Cécile de Goncourt (née Guérin). Marc-Pierre was a retired cavalry officer and squadron leader in the Grande Armée of Napoléon I. The brothers' great-grandfather, Antoine Huot de Goncourt, purchased the seigneurie of the village of Goncourt in the Meuse Valley in 1786, and their grandfather Huot sat as a deputy in the National Assembly of 1789. The brothers' uncle, Pierre Antoine Victor Huot de Goncourt, was a deputy for the Vosges in the National Assembly between 1848 and 1851. In 1860, the brothers applied to the Keeper of the Seals for the exclusive use of the noble title "de Goncourt", but their claim was refused.

Partnership
They formed a partnership that "is possibly unique in literary history. Not only did they write all their books together, they did not spend more than a day apart in their adult lives, until they were finally parted by Jules's death in 1870." They are known for their literary work and for their diaries, which offer an intimate view into the French literary society of the later 19th century.

Career

Their career as writers began with an account of a sketching holiday together. They then published books on aspects of 18th-century French and Japanese art and society. Their histories (Portraits intimes du XVIIIe siècle (1857), La Femme au XVIIIe siècle (1862), La du Barry (1878), and others) are made entirely out of documents, autograph letters, scraps of costume, engravings, songs, the unconscious self-revelations of the time. Their first novel, En 18..., had the misfortune of being published on December 2nd 1851, the day of Napoléon III's coup d'état against the Second Republic. As such it was completely overlooked.

In their volumes (e.g., Portraits intimes du XVIII siecle), they dismissed the vulgarity of the Second Empire in favour of a more refined age. They wrote the long Journal des Goncourt from 1851, which gives a view of the literary and social life of their time. In 1852, the brothers were arrested, and ultimately acquitted, for an "outrage against public morality" after they quoted erotic Renaissance poetry in an article. From 1862, the brothers frequented the salon of the Princess Mathilde, where they mixed with fellow writers like Gustave Flaubert, Théophile Gautier, and Paul de Saint-Victor. In November 1862, they began attending bi-monthly dinners at Magny's restaurant with a group of intellectuals, writers, journalists, and artists. These included George Sand, Charles Augustin Sainte-Beuve, Flaubert, Ernest Renan, and Paul de Saint-Victor. From 1863, the brothers would systematically record the comments made at these dinners in the Journal.

In 1865, the brothers premiered their play Henriette Maréchal at the Comédie-Française, but its realism provoked protests and it was banned after only six performances.

When they came to write novels, it was with a similar attempt to give the inner, undiscovered, minute truths of contemporary existence. They published six novels, of which Germinie Lacerteux, 1865, was the fourth. It is based on the true case of their own maidservant, Rose Malingre, whose double life they had never suspected. After the death of Jules, Edmond continued to write novels in the same style.

According to the Encyclopædia Britannica Eleventh Edition:

They are buried together (in the same grave) in Montmartre Cemetery.

Legacy
Edmond de Goncourt bequeathed his entire estate for the foundation and maintenance of the Académie Goncourt. Since 1903, the académie has awarded the Prix Goncourt, probably the most important literary prize in French literature.

The first English translation of Manette Salomon, translated by Tina Kover, was published in November 2017 by Snuggly Books.

Works
Novels
En 18... (1851)
Sœur Philomène (1861)
Renée Mauperin (1864)
Germinie Lacerteux (1865)
Manette Salomon (1867)
Madame Gervaisais (1869)
and, by Edmond alone:
La Fille Elisa (1878)
Les Frères Zemganno (1879)
La Faustin (1882)
Chérie (1884)

Plays
Henriette Maréchal (Performed at the Comédie-Française in 1865)
La patrie en danger (Published 1873, performed at the Théâtre Libre in 1889)

Other
La Révolution dans les moeurs (1854)
Histoire de la société française pendant la Révolution (1854)
Histoire de la société française pendant le Directoire (1855)
Sophie Arnould (1857)
Journal des Goncourt, 1851–1896
Portraits intimes du XVIIIe siècle (1857)
Histoire de Marie Antoinette (1858)
Les Maîtresses de Louis XV (1860)
La Femme au XVIIIe siècle (1862)
La du Barry (1878)
Madame de Pompadour (1878)
La Duchesse de Chateauroux et ses soeurs (1879)
L'Art du XVIIIe siècle (French Eighteenth Century Painters) (1859–1875)

Notes

References
Edmond & Jules de Goncourt. Journal des Goncourt: Mémoires de la Vie Littéraire I, 1851-1865 (Robert Laffont, 1989) 
Kirsch, Adam "Masters of indiscretion" in The New York Sun August 29, 2006

External links

 "Goncourt Brothers and the Taste for the 18th Century" symposium at the Frick Collection, featuring art historians Olivier Berggruen and Yuriko Jackall

French literary critics
Writing duos
Sibling duos
French male writers
French male non-fiction writers